Acanthopsyche subteralbata is a moth of the family Psychidae first described by George Hampson in 1897. It is found in India and Sri Lanka.

Larval host plants are Camellia sinensis and Albizia.

References

Moths of Asia
Moths described in 1897
Psychidae